The Taif massacre was an incident that followed the short 1924 Battle of Taif; the entire episode is also known as the al-Taif incident. The battle and resultant massacre comprised the first major standoff of the Second Hashemite-Saudi War. Following a short siege, the city was abandoned by Hashemite forces and then capitulated to the battle-ready Ikhwan force under the command of Abdulaziz Ibn Saud. The Ikhwan troops took out their rage on the residents of the city. In the resulting bloodbath, some 400-1000 Ta'if residents were massacred.

Following the fall of Taif, Saud's forces moved on Mecca.

Background
Ta'if was taken by the Hashemite forces in September 1916, during the Arab Revolt, and later incorporated into the Kingdom of Hejaz. Ta'if did not remain in Hashemite hands for very long however. Tensions between the King of the Hejaz, Husayn ibn Ali, and Abdulaziz al-Saud, Sultan of Nejd, soon broke out into violence. The hostilities were temporarily patched up in 1919, with truce signed in the aftermath of the First Hashemite-Saudi War.

Conquest and massacre
In late August 1924, the Saudi-allied Ikhwan, under the leadership of Sultan bin Bajad and Khaled bin Luwai were ready to attack Ta'if. The city was supposed to have been defended by the king’s son, Ali, but he fled in panic with his troops.

The city was quickly breached by the Ikhwan on 3 September or it surrendered on 29 August, after which the Ikhwan went on a rampage through the city. In the resulting massacre, some 300 to 400 of Ta'if residents were killed.

Aftermath
Following the fall of Ta'if the Saudi forces moved to conquer Mecca, Medina, and eventually Jeddah, which fell in December 1925, completing the conquest of Hejaz. In 1926 Abdulaziz al-Saud was officially recognized as the new king of Hejaz. Ta'if remained a part of the Kingdom of Hejaz until Abdulaziz al-Saud unified his two kingdoms into one under the title of the Kingdom of Saudi Arabia in 1932.

The king would later die in the city on 9 November 1953.

See also
History of Saudi Arabia

References

Conflicts in 1924
August 1924 events
September 1924 events
History of Saudi Arabia
Mass murder in 1924
Massacres in 1924
Battles involving Saudi Arabia
1924 in Saudi Arabia